Bich Minh "Beth" Nguyen (born 1974) is an American novelist and nonfiction writer. She is the author of the novels Short Girls, which won a 2010 American Book Award, and Pioneer Girl, and a memoir, Stealing Buddha's Dinner.

Life 
Bich Minh Nguyen was born in 1974 in Saigon, which her family fled by ship the following year. After staying in refugee camps in Guam and at Fort Chaffee in Arkansas, they settled in Grand Rapids, Michigan, where Nguyen grew up.
She graduated from the University of Michigan with a Master of Fine Arts and is married to novelist Porter Shreve. They have two children. In 2005, she received a PEN/Jerard Award. She taught at Purdue University and the University of San Francisco, and is currently a professor at the University of Wisconsin-Madison, where she teaches fiction and creative non-fiction writing.

Works

Anthologies

Reviews

References

External links 
 Author's website
 "Welcome to the Great Michigan Read", Bich Minh Nguyen
 "Bich Minh Nguyen", 29th Key West Literary Seminar

Living people
1974 births
21st-century American novelists
21st-century American women writers
American novelists of Asian descent
American women novelists
American writers of Vietnamese descent
University of Michigan alumni
Vietnamese emigrants to the United States
Vietnamese writers
American Book Award winners
English-language literature of Vietnam